Warren Ruggiero (born April 2, 1966) is an American football coach who is currently the offensive coordinator for Wake Forest.

Raised in Glen Rock, New Jersey, Ruggiero played prep football at Glen Rock High School.

Coaching career

Early coaching career
Ruggiero spent five seasons as the offensive coordinator at Defiance College and three in the same role at Clarion.  During his time at Clarion, the team made a national semi-final appearance in 1996.

Glenville State
Ruggiero spent two seasons as the head coach at Glenville State. He led the Pioneers to the Division two playoffs and finished with a 15–8 record.

William & Mary
Ruggiero coached tight ends during his time at W&M.

Hofstra
Ruggiero started as the quarterbacks coach and was promoted to offensive coordinator. The Pride led the Atlantic 10 conference in passing during the 2004 and 2005 seasons under Ruggiero. He also recruited and coached Marques Colston.  Ruggiero also helped coach quarterback Rocky Butler to the fourth-most passing yards in I-AA.

Elon
Ruggiero spent two seasons at Elon where he coached quarterback Scott Riddle to first-team All-American honors and Southern Conference freshman of the year, while setting many school records.

Kansas State
In his only season at Kansas State, Ruggiero coached future first-round pick Josh Freeman and mentored Collin Klein.

Bowling Green 
Ruggiero helped Bowling Green to 31st in total offense in 2013.  Also during the 2013 season Bowling Green went 10-3 and averaged 35.4 points per game.

Wake Forest
Ruggiero's offense set records for points scored and total yards in 2017.  Under Ruggiero, the offense has broken over 100 individual and team records. He has also coached three successful quarterbacks in John Wolford, Jamie Newman, and Sam Hartman.

Head coaching record

References

External links
 Wake Forest profile
 Bowling Green profile
 Delaware profile

1966 births
Living people
American football quarterbacks
Bowling Green Falcons football coaches
Clarion Golden Eagles football coaches
Defiance Yellow Jackets football coaches
Delaware Fightin' Blue Hens football players
Elon Phoenix football coaches
Glenville State Pioneers football coaches
Hofstra Pride football coaches
Kansas State Wildcats football coaches
Wake Forest Demon Deacons football coaches
William & Mary Tribe football coaches
Glen Rock High School alumni
People from Glen Rock, New Jersey
Sportspeople from Bergen County, New Jersey
Coaches of American football from New Jersey
Players of American football from New Jersey